ESPN Canada may refer to one of the following:
 ESPN Classic (Canada)
 The Sports Network, an English cable station partially owned by ESPN in Canada
 Réseau des sports, a French cable station partially owned by ESPN in Canada